Stanislav Petrovich Vorotilin (born 11 June 1938 in Moscow; died 13 May 2013 in Yaroslavl) was a Russian football manager and player.

External links
 

1938 births
Footballers from Moscow
2013 deaths
Soviet footballers
Association football midfielders
FC FShM Torpedo Moscow players
FC Shinnik Yaroslavl players
FC Dynamo Moscow players
Soviet Top League players
Soviet football managers
Russian football managers
FC Shinnik Yaroslavl managers
Russian Premier League managers